On 13 August 1993, the IRA planted 8 bombs around the British town of Bournemouth of which 5 were detonated in 2 separate attacks. In the first, 4 incendiary devices out of 6 were detonated in the town centre destroying a Maple & Co. furniture store and damaging 3 other shops. Later that day, a bomb went off on Bournemouth Pier which caused structural damage and a much larger explosive was defused by police. Only minor injuries were reported.

The morning before the bombings occurred, a bomb warning was called in to the Brighton police. The caller claimed to be with the IRA and warned police of possible attacks on the town of Bournemouth, as well as the cities of Brighton and Torquay.

References

Bournemouth bombing
Bournemouth bombing
Bournemouth bombing
History of Bournemouth
Provisional IRA bombings in England
Building bombings in England
Disasters in Dorset